Kasman is a surname. Notable people with the surname include:

Bruce Kasman, American economist
Firdaus Kasman (born 1988), Singapore footballer
Leon Kasman (1905–1984), Polish journalist and politician
Yakov Kasman (born 1967), Russian-American classical pianist and professor